Loft Music is an album by the English singer-songwriter by Thea Gilmore, released in June 2004. It is an album of cover versions of other artists' songs, chosen from suggestions sent in by fans. Gilmore described Loft Music as an addendum to her 2003 album Avalanche. She called it a "this is where I came in" piece, recorded in homage to the writers and performers whose spirit stood with her during the album's execution.

Background and recording
The album was recorded at The Loft, Liverpool - hence the title - and was co-produced by Nigel Stonier and Mike Cave.

Reception
Pop Matters gave the album an 8 out of 10 score, praising her takes on the songs as so good that "...you start to wonder why the original performers didn't do it her way in the first place."

Track listing

Personnel
Thea Gilmore - vocals
Nigel Stonier - all other instruments
Mike Cave
Jim Kirkpatrick - National Steel on 7

References

External links
Gilmore's official website

2003 albums
Thea Gilmore albums